Sweet Relationship is a 2007 Taiwanese drama starring Vic Chou of F4, Alan Kuo, Megan Lai and Patty Hou. It is based on a Japanese josei manga  by Satoru Makimura. It was produced by Comic Ritz International Production (可米瑞智國際藝能有限公司) with Chai Zhi Ping (柴智屏) as producer and directed by Chu Yu-ning (瞿友寧).

The series was first broadcast in Taiwan on free-to-air Chinese Television System (CTS) (華視) from 16 September 2007 to 27 January 2008, every Sunday from 22:00 to 23:30 and cable TV Gala Television (GTV) Variety Show/CH 28 (八大綜合台) from 22 September 2007 to 2 February 2008, every Saturday at 21:00. It only received moderate rating despite the promising cast as well as story. The average rating of the drama after the final episode was 1.50.

Synopsis
The story revolves around two polar opposites who wouldn't have met if it hadn't been for luck. Chang Bai Hui (Patty Hou) is a simple girl with extraordinary taste when it comes to food and dining. She could tell the difference between fine dining and a poor cooked meal in an instant.  Ever since she was little, food has been the center of her world. It celebrated her college graduation and consoled her when her beloved father died.

Fang Zi Tian (Vic Chou) is a world-renowned Chef who could have easily made headlines if he cared about it.  He has an amazing cooking talent that sets him apart, and an ability to gain anyone's respect in the cooking world.  Yet, he found no joy in what he does.

By stroke of fate, their paths cross several times. Though at first Zi Tian was less than pleased to have Bai Hui hanging around his life, he eventually grew to enjoy having her. Bai Hui's arrival in his life not only reignites his passion for cooking but it also taught him countless lessons in life. Just like Zi Tian, though in a different manner, Bai Hui was also changed.  She grew up and matured to understand the world better, but none were to happen if it hadn't been for the help of those around them.

Cast
 Vic Chou (周渝民) as Fang Zi Tian 方織田
 Patty Hou (侯佩岑) as Chang Bai Hui 常百惠
 Alan Kuo (柯有綸) as He Ma Yang 何馬揚
 Megan Lai (賴雅妍) as Ren Ke Xin 任可欣
 Zhu De Gang (朱德剛) as Cheng Jia Jun 成家俊
 Teresa Ji (紀培慧) as Cheng Qiang 成薔
 Zhang Yong Zhi (張永智) as Gao Qiao 高橋
 Deng Jiu Yun (鄧九雲) as Lu Chuan Lin 陸川琳
 Billie (比莉) as Jin Dao Po Po 金刀婆婆
 Gu Xuan Chun (谷炫淳) as Gu Jian Xian 辜見賢
 Xu Zhen Wei (徐振偉) as B Pang B胖
 Eric Tu (涂百峰) as Eric
 Cha Ma Ke (查馬克) as Cha Ke 查克
 Tang Qi as Tang Tang Jie 糖糖姐
 Gui Ye (龜爺) as Gui Ye
 Lin You Fang (林有方) as Zhu Rou Biao 豬肉彪
 Cai Jie De (蔡皆得) as Doctor Cai
 Luo Bei An (羅北安) as Duo Feng 多風
 Bao Ma (寶媽) as Bao Ma (ep01)
 Fei Zhen Hua (費鎮華) as Chang's father (ep01)
 Chien Te-men as Restaurant manager (ep01)
 Wang De Sheng (王德生) as Chang's family friend (ep01)
 Eric Chen as teenage Fang Zi Tian
 Matt Wu as Liang Hai Tao 梁海濤
 Tai Bao (太保) as Ma Yang's father
 Li Dai Ling (李黛玲) as Ma Yang's mother
 Weber Yang as Flyer distributor (cameo)

Soundtrack

Sweet Relationship Original Soundtrack (美味關係 電視原聲帶) was released on 17 December 2007 by Joanna Wang, Megan Lai, Alan Kuo, and Vic Chou under Sony Music Entertainment (Taiwan). It contains ten songs, in which four songs are various instrumental versions of some songs. The opening theme song is "Ai Shang Zhe Shi Jie" or "In Love With This World" by Vic Chou, while the ending theme song is by Alan Kuo entitled "Don't Say Goodbye".

Track listing

Reception

Source: Chinatimes Showbiz

International Broadcast
It was aired in the Philippines through Q-11 which was dubbed in Tagalog on May 24 at 15:00 (PST) under the working title Magic Taste.

References

External links
  Comic Ritz Sweet Relationship website
  CTS Sweet Relationship website
  GTV Sweet Relationship website
 Sina

Chinese Television System original programming
Gala Television original programming
2007 Taiwanese television series debuts
2008 Taiwanese television series endings
Taiwanese television dramas based on manga